The 2010 African Handball Champions League was the 32nd edition, organized by the African Handball Confederation, under the auspices of the International Handball Federation, the handball sport governing body. The tournament was held from October 22–30, 2010 at the Complexe Sportif Mohammed V in Casablanca, Morocco, contested by 10 teams and won by Atlético Petróleos de Luanda of Angola.

Draw

Preliminary round 

Times given below are in WET UTC+0.

Group A

* Note:  Advance to quarter-finals Relegated to 9th place classification

Group B

* Note:  Advance to quarter-finals Relegated to 9th place classification** Penalty for failing to pay participation fees

Knockout stage
Championship bracket

5-8th bracket

9th place

Final ranking

References

External links
 Tournament profile at adrare.net
 CAHB Official website

African Women's Handball Champions League
African Handball Champions League
African Handball Champions League
2010 Africa Handball Champions League
International handball competitions hosted by Morocco